Dorstenia belizensis is a plant species in the family Moraceae which is native to Belize.

References

belizensis
Plants described in 1982
Flora of Belize
Endemic flora of Belize